Rialto, is a commercial television channel in New Zealand. It began broadcasting in November 2002 on SKY Network Television.

The channel screens films, documentaries and general entertainment programming. The channel has at times sponsored the New Zealand Film Awards.

References

New Zealand's Film Commission Press release Jan. 26 2006. Retrieved Feb. 19 2006.
Rialto Channel (2004)  Retrieved Feb. 19, 2006
SKY Network Television Limited (2005).  Retrieved Feb. 19, 2006

External links

Rialto Channel 

Television stations in New Zealand
English-language television stations in New Zealand
Television channels in New Zealand